Black Pudding Peak is an isolated black mountain located  northwest of Mount Brøgger in the Prince Albert Mountains, Victoria Land. It was named for its squat black appearance (see black pudding) by the 1957 New Zealand Northern Survey Party of the Commonwealth Trans-Antarctic Expedition, 1956–58.

References 

Mountains of Victoria Land
Scott Coast